The Lazarus Effect is a 2015 American supernatural horror film directed by David Gelb and written by Luke Dawson and Jeremy Slater. The film stars Mark Duplass, Olivia Wilde, Donald Glover, Evan Peters, and Sarah Bolger. The film was released on February 27, 2015, by Relativity Media. It received negative reviews from critics but was a box office success, grossing $38 million worldwide against a budget of $3 million.

Plot
At a university, medical researchers Dr. Frank Walton and his fiancée, Dr. Zoe McConnell, have developed a serum, code-named "Lazarus", intended to assist coma patients but shown to be able to actually bring the dead back to life. Videography student Eva joins them in the lab to document their project.

With the assistance of their lab associates, Niko and Clay, they run a successful trial on a recently euthanized dog, Rocky. However, Rocky displays several unusual psychological and physical phenomena after being revived by the serum: cataracts formerly present in his eyes abruptly dissolve, he loses his appetite, and he displays increased aggression. Tests reveal that the serum, instead of dissipating, is concentrated within Rocky's brain, where it is causing new synapses to be constructed.

When the dean of their university learns of their underground experiments, their project is shut down. They are also informed that a major pharmaceutical company has bought out the company that funded their research. The company confiscates everything associated with the project.

Frank and his team sneak back into their lab to duplicate the experiment so that they can prove that they created the serum. During this attempt, things go horribly wrong after Zoe is fatally electrocuted. Despite warnings from the others, a distraught Frank uses the serum to resurrect her. Initially, the procedure appears to be a success, but the team soon realizes that something is wrong with Zoe. She claims that when she died, she went to her version of Hell, which was a nightmare originating from her childhood: during a fire in her apartment building, she witnessed trapped neighbors burning to death. She also begins to demonstrate unusual psychic abilities as the serum begins to take effect.

They realize that the serum causes brains to "evolve" rapidly, giving Zoe superhuman abilities such as telekinesis and telepathy. It also causes increased aggression and insanity. Zoe eventually finds Eva and shows her the nightmarish Hell she experienced. It is revealed that Zoe was the one that caused the fire in the building, and she went to Hell when she died. Zoe kills Rocky and then attempts to seduce Niko, but after he refuses, she uses telekinesis to throw him into a locker and crush it with him inside, killing him. Using her new abilities, she cuts the power to the entire lab. When Clay demands to know where Niko is, she kills him by lodging an e-cigarette into his throat. Later, Zoe kills Frank after he attempts to inject her with poison. Zoe then injects herself with an entire bag of the serum, strengthening her abilities.

Eva, who is still alive and trying to locate Zoe to inject her, is left in the dark. Zoe eventually finds Eva, who is apparently able to escape and inject Zoe with the syringe, but it turns out to be an illusion; Zoe then kills Eva. Zoe then injects Frank with her own serum-saturated blood, successfully bringing him back from the dead.

Cast
 Mark Duplass as Dr. Frank Walton
 Olivia Wilde as Dr. Zoe McConnell
 Sarah Bolger as Eva
 Evan Peters as Clay
 Donald Glover as Niko
 Ray Wise as Mr. Wallace
 Amy Aquino as President Dalley

Release
On December 17, 2013, it was announced that the film (then titled Lazarus) would be released on January 30, 2015, with Lionsgate distributing the film. On November 4, 2014, Relativity Media acquired the film from Lionsgate and set the film's release date for February 20, 2015. In December 2014, it was then announced that the film would be retitled The Lazarus Effect, and be released a week later than previously planned, on February 27, 2015.

Marketing
The first still of the film was released on January 5, 2015, along with the theatrical poster.

Box office
In North America, the film opened to number five in its first weekend, with $10,203,437, behind Focus, Kingsman: The Secret Service, The SpongeBob Movie: Sponge Out of Water, and Fifty Shades of Grey.

Reception
The Lazarus Effect received generally negative reviews from critics. On Rotten Tomatoes 15% of 110 reviews were positive, with an average rating of 4/10. The site's consensus reads "The Lazarus Effect has a talented cast and the glimmer of an interesting idea, but wastes it all on insipid characters and dull, recycled plot points." On Metacritic, the film has a weighted average score of 31 out of 100, based on 29 critics, indicating "generally unfavorable reviews". Audiences polled by CinemaScore gave the film a grade of "C−" on an A+ to F scale.

Frank Scheck of The Hollywood Reporter gave the film a negative review, saying "The film squanders whatever potential it had, not to mention the talents of such performers as Duplass and Wilde who clearly deserve better." James Rocchi of The Wrap gave the film four out of five stars, saying "The Lazarus Effect doesn't exactly break new ground, but it nonetheless finds plenty to relish in the mouldering bits it stitches together as it gives classic themes about death, life and the soul a literal and figurative shot in the arm." Geoff Berkshire of Variety gave the film a negative review, saying "Mark Duplass and Olivia Wilde struggle to breathe life into a recycled thriller about the horrors of reanimation." Mick LaSalle of the San Francisco Chronicle gave the film one out of four stars, saying "This is an 83-minute movie that feels a half hour longer and, if it weren't for the loud crescendos, it would put people to sleep." Claudia Puig of USA Today gave the film two and a half stars out of four, saying "Absorbing, well-crafted and appropriately tense, with a smart cast that raises it a notch above average." Lou Lumenick of the New York Post gave the film zero stars, saying "Looks like it was directed by a blind and deaf person over a weekend on a leftover laboratory set from a TV show and edited with a roulette wheel." Peter Keough of The Boston Globe gave the film a negative review, saying "There are lessons to be learned from this minimalist thriller. The first is that scaring people requires more than just tossing furniture around, turning the lights off and on, and basically sneaking up from behind and shouting "Boo!"

A.A. Dowd of The A.V. Club gave the film a C−, saying "Like too many horror films, this one seems targeted at a hypothetical audience using only 10 percent of its brainpower." Joe Neumaier of the New York Daily News gave the film two out of five stars, saying "The Lazarus Effect, clocking in at a brief 86 minutes, doesn’t go far enough, isn’t scary enough and has mad scientists who just aren’t mad enough. You watch it hoping it revives itself, but that dream is dead and buried." Michael O'Sullivan of The Washington Post gave the film one out of four stars, saying "It staggers, zombielike, from one jump-scare to another before petering out, a scant 83 minutes after rising from the slab." Bruce Demara of the Toronto Star gave the film two out of four stars, saying "While The Lazarus Effect isn't the worst scary movie film you'll see this year, it is probably one of the most predictable and lazily plotted." James Berardinelli of ReelViews gave the film two out of four stars, saying "The Lazarus Effect begins with an intriguing premise then proceeds to squander all the early goodwill through a slow, inexorable descent into cheap horror gimmicks." Kevin C. Johnson of the St. Louis Post-Dispatch gave the film two out of four stars, saying "The Lazarus Effect boasts nothing special. It's not going to provide much relief for horror-starved audiences." Keith Staskiewicz of Entertainment Weekly gave the film a C−, saying "I would have loved to see more from the filmmakers, daring to fail while staking out some new terror incognita instead of just going through the motions of an experiment for which we already have the results."

References

External links
 
 

2015 films
2015 horror films
2015 horror thriller films
American supernatural horror films
American horror thriller films
Blumhouse Productions films
Relativity Media films
Resurrection in film
2010s science fiction horror films
Films about scientists
Films about telekinesis
Films produced by Jason Blum
Films with screenplays by Jeremy Slater
American science fiction horror films
American body horror films
2010s English-language films
2010s American films